Joe Mazzucco (born July 16, 1891, date of death unknown) was an Italian racecar driver. He tried to qualify for the 1914 Indy 500, but was unsuccessful. He was born in Winnipeg, Manitoba, Canada.

See also
List of Canadians in Champ Car

External links
 ChampCarStats

1891 births
Year of death missing
Italian racing drivers
Racing drivers from Manitoba
Canadian people of Italian descent
Sportspeople from Winnipeg
Emigrants from Canada to Italy